Sailing was contested at the 2005 Summer Universiade in Karşıyaka, Turkey.

Medal summary

Medallists

Sources
 Sailing results at the 2005 Summer Universiade

2005 Summer Universiade
Sailing at the Summer Universiade
Sailing competitions in Turkey